The 1931 Washington and Lee Generals football team was an American football team that represented Washington and Lee University during the 1931 college football season as a member of the Southern Conference. In their fifth year under head coach Jimmy DeHart, the team compiled an overall record of 4–5–1, with a mark of 2–3 in conference play.

Schedule

References

Washington and Lee
Washington and Lee Generals football seasons
Washington and Lee Generals football